Beaty Lake is a lake in St. Francis County, Arkansas.

References 

Bodies of water of St. Francis County, Arkansas
Lakes of Arkansas